The Cumberland Fair is an annual farmers' fair held in Cumberland, Maine, United States, at the Cumberland Fairgrounds. It is put on by the Cumberland Farmers' Club and is usually held the last week in September.

Events

The annual Maine State Pumpkin and Squash Weigh-Off is held at the fair. The winner of the event receives $500. An adult is limited to one entry in the giant squash and pumpkin weigh-off. The 2015 winner of this event was Edwin Pierpont, who harvested a 1,046 pound pumpkin.

History
The inaugural Cumberland Fair was held for two days, on October 10 and 11, 1868 in the center of town in the back of what is now Greely Junior High School. The land was provided by Capt. Enos Blanchard. On show were foods, handicrafts, vegetables of all shapes and sizes and also steers, especially in the traditional ox-pull. Horse racing was also featured.

There was no fair in 1919, 1942-44 nor 2020, although the latter year saw the 4H livestock show & auction go on.

References

External links
Cumberland Fair Web site

Recurring events established in 1868
Tourist attractions in Cumberland County, Maine
Cultural festivals in the United States
Festivals in Maine
Agricultural shows in the United States
Cumberland, Maine
1868 establishments in Maine